Fred E. Bacon was a late-19th century British runner who won numerous running titles and briefly held the amateur world record for the mile.

Born in Boxted, Essex, Bacon competed for Ashton-under-Lyne Harriers whilst stationed there as a soldier.

Bacon won the AAA mile title three consecutive years from 1893 , his 1895 winning time a world amateur record of 4:17. The record was short-lived, eclipsed by American runner Thomas Conneff the following month.

He additionally won the AAA four-mile (6 km) title in 1894, the  title in 1895  and set a world record in the One-Hour run.

 1891 first mention for Ashton-under-Lyne Harriers
 1893 Northern Cross Country Champion
 1894 running for Essex but usually Ashton-under-Lyne Harriers
 1894 AAA four mile (6 km) title 19.48.8
 1893 World mile record holder time 4.22.2
 1894 world mile record holder time 4.18.2
 1895 world mile record holder time 4.17.0
 1895 AAA ten miles (16 km) champion 52:43.8; became professional
 1896 Won ¾ mile race in 3.02.4 proving sub 4 min mile was possible
 1896 invited to New York
 1896 beat Conneff
 1897 world 1 hour record Rochdale 11 miles 1243 yards 30,000 crowd (beat Deerfoot's  34 year record).

After his running career ended, Bacon went on to become the trainer for Manchester United Football club until 1912.

There is little information about what Bacon did after leaving Manchester United.

He left Manchester United under a cloud and left his family. In 1914 he joined up and was based on the Humber defences at Cleethorpes where he remained until his death in 1954.

References

British male middle-distance runners
19th-century births
Year of death missing
People from Boxted, Essex
Manchester United F.C. non-playing staff